Eddie Wingren (born 2 August 1940) is a retired Swedish ice hockey player. Wingren was part of the Djurgården Swedish champions' team of 1959, 1960, 1961, 1962, and 1963.

References

Swedish ice hockey players
Djurgårdens IF Hockey players
1940 births
Living people